Transportation in the Canadian city of Toronto forms the hub of the road, rail and air networks in the Greater Toronto Area and much of southern Ontario. There are many forms of transport in the city, including railways, highways, and public transit. Toronto also has an extensive network of bicycle lanes and multi-use trails and paths.

Railways

Toronto is a major rail transportation hub in Canada and central North America, with most commercial rail freight operations carried out by two Class I railways, Canadian National Railway and Canadian Pacific Railway. Both companies operate major yards and intermodal facilities in various parts of Toronto to serve manufacturing and logistics customers. 
Although at one time, both railways saw most of their operations based out of the waterfront area, over time they have shifted to facilities in suburban Toronto or adjacent municipalities. Most waterfront trackage has been scaled back and abandoned in favour of real-estate development, with the remaining main lines in this area being almost the exclusive domain of passenger carriers. Significant portions of the railway network in the City of Toronto have been sold by the commercial railways to GO Transit, the provincial commuter rail operator.

Toronto is served by inter-city Via Rail to other Canadian cities and Amtrak's daily New York City trains through Union Station, a grand neoclassical structure in the heart of the city's downtown, which is shared with GO Transit's commuter trains.

The Union Pearson Express, an airport rail link from Toronto Pearson International Airport to Union Station and the central business district, started operation on June 6, 2015. It was completed in time for the 2015 Pan American Games.

Bus terminals
GO Transit operates all of its commuter bus services into and out of downtown Toronto from the Union Station Bus Terminal, a terminal owned and operated by GO Transit and adjacent to Union Station. This bus terminal was opened in 2020, replacing an earlier Union Station GO Bus Terminal. GO Transit also operates the Yorkdale Bus Terminal at Yorkdale Shopping Centre and several terminals at subway stations, including Finch Bus Terminal, Scarborough Centre Bus Terminal and York Mills Bus Terminal.

Most intercity coach services operate out of the new Union Station Bus Terminal after relocating from the decommissioned Toronto Coach Terminal at Bay and Dundas in 2021. Intercity coach companies operating services out of the Union Station Bus Terminal include Ontario Northland, Megabus, TOK Coachlines, and Greyhound Lines.

Highways
There are a number of freeways that serve both the city proper and the Greater Toronto Area. Bisecting the city from west to east across its inner suburbs, Highway 401 (or simply, "the 401") acts as a bypass of the downtown core, and is both the busiest and widest highway in Canada. At its interchange with Highway 400, where it spans 18 lanes, it sees over 400,000 vehicles on an average day, making it one of the world's busiest highways.

At the western edge of the city, the 401 meets Highway 427, an important north–south artery between Toronto Pearson International Airport and the Gardiner Expressway. It mainly serves the airport and the western suburbs outside the city of Toronto. In the same area, the short length of Highway 409 connects the airport directly to the traffic flow of the 401. Moving east, the 401 then intersects Highway 400, which leads north to Barrie, the recreational areas of Ontario's "Cottage Country" and beyond, to the northern reaches of the province. East of the 400, the 401 meets Allen Road, and then the Don Valley ParkwayHighway 404, before continuing eastwards out of Toronto into the suburbs of Pickering, Ajax, Whitby, and Oshawa.

The Allen Road is an expressway from Eglinton Avenue to Sheppard Avenue north of the 401. The Don Valley Parkway is a north–south expressway that links downtown Toronto to the 401. Beyond the 401, this route is known as Highway 404, and connects the more distant outer suburbs of Markham, Richmond Hill, Aurora, and Newmarket to the 401.

The Gardiner Expressway (or colloquially, "the Gardiner") roughly follows the northern shore of Lake Ontario, and connects the western suburbs to the downtown core. West of Highway 427, the Gardiner becomes Queen Elizabeth Way (often called the QEW, or simply "The Q.E."), which heads towards Hamilton, Niagara Falls, and Fort Erie (and the Canada–United States border in the vicinity of Buffalo).

Highway 407 ETR is not located within Toronto proper, but is a major highway in the Greater Toronto Area that acts as a secondary bypass around the northern end of the city, stretching from Burlington in the west to Pickering in the east. It is an electronic toll road with no physical toll booths, instead depending on automatic recognition of vehicle plates or electronic toll collection.

Roads

Toronto has 9500 roads or 5200 kilometres across the city.

Toronto is largely built on a grid-based road system with a few notable exceptions. These include streets such as Davenport Road and Vaughan Road, which follow an old native trail, while others, such as Kingston Road, were originally constructed to link Toronto with other settlements in Ontario. The street network downtown mostly consists of a dense network of four-lane arterial and collector roads typical of an older North American city. Outside the downtown core, most arterial roads have two or three lanes of traffic in each direction. Toronto's road system was mainly designed for vehicular traffic, and is quite easy to navigate. There are some anomalies; for example, Lawrence Avenue and St. Clair Avenue are both split into two sections by the Don Valley, and, in the case of St. Clair Avenue, the drive between the two sections is almost 15 minutes. Roads sometimes change names, and the 1998 Amalgamation has caused some doubling in road names, although this is usually confined to smaller, more residential, roads.

The main north–south arteries, from west to east, are Kipling Avenue, Islington Avenue, Royal York Road, Jane Street, Keele Street / Weston Road, Dufferin Street, Bathurst Street, Avenue Road / University Avenue, Yonge Street, Bayview Avenue, Leslie Street, Don Mills Road, Victoria Park Avenue, Warden Avenue, Kennedy Road, McCowan Road, Markham Road, and Morningside Avenue. The main east–west arteries, from north to south, are Steeles Avenue, Finch Avenue, Sheppard Avenue, Wilson Avenue / York Mills Road / Ellesmere Road (the latter two connected by Parkwoods Village Drive), Lawrence Avenue, Eglinton Avenue, St. Clair Avenue, Bloor Street / Danforth Avenue, Dundas Street, Queen Street West and East, and Lake Shore Boulevard / Kingston Road.

Roads in Toronto are often potted with potholes due to freezing and thawing in the winter-spring seasons. On average, there are 100 major potholes reported with a high of 1000. Potholes are repaired by city crews. Full paving is done by contractors when the need arises.

Toll roads
From 1820 to 1896, tolls were collected on roads leaving the old city boundaries:

 Yonge and King
 Yonge and College/Carlton
 Yonge Street and Bloor Street
 Yonge Street at Gallows Hill
 Queen Street West and Ossington Avenue

No Toronto roads have been tolled since 1896; the closest is Highway 407 in Durham Region, York Region and Peel Region; the expressway runs northeast, north and northwest of the city, respectively.

Public transportation

Within the city, the Toronto Transit Commission (TTC) operates an extensive system of subways, buses, and streetcars, covering  of routes. A single flat fare applies for any trip within the city regardless of distance or transfers required with the exception of contracted routes that travel outside of the city and downtown express routes. The TTC is the third busiest transit agency by ridership in North America (after the Mexico City Metro and New York City's New York City Transit Authority).

Buses and streetcars

The rest of the city is primarily served by a network of about 150 bus routes, many of them forming a grid along main streets. Most bus routes connect to one or more subway stations, save a few routes that serve bus depots or GO stations. A more distinctive feature of the TTC is the streetcar system, one of the few remaining in North America with a substantial amount of in-street operation. The city of Toronto has the largest streetcar system in the Americas.

Metro rail

The backbone of the TTC is a subway system with two lines, Line 1 Yonge–University and Line 2 Bloor–Danforth, running along principal streets and connecting Toronto's outlying areas with its downtown core.

Commuter rail
Inter-regional commuter rail and bus service is provided by GO Transit. GO trains and buses connect the city to the rest of the Greater Toronto Area. Ontario Northland Motor Coach Services operates buses to destinations in northern Ontario.

Airports

Toronto Pearson International Airport

Toronto's primary airport is Toronto Pearson International Airport (YYZ), straddling Toronto's western boundary with Mississauga. Pearson's air traffic is over 41million passengers in 2015, and it is the world's largest originator of air traffic into the United States. It is the busiest airport in Canada and is the largest hub for Air Canada. It is the world's 15th busiest airport by flights as of 2014.

Billy Bishop Toronto City Airport (Island Airport)
The city also has a small commercial airport, the Billy Bishop Toronto City Airport (YTZ), commonly known as the "island airport" on Toronto Island, southwest of downtown. The airport is used for civil aviation, medevac flights, and regional airlines using STOL-type turboprop aircraft. Since 1984, regional carriers have included City Express, Jazz Air and since 2006, Porter Airlines. Airport access is via a short ferry ride or tunnel. 508,574 passengers used the airport in 2008, making it the busiest one-airline served airport in the world. In 2009 it surpassed Thunder Bay International Airport to become the 3rd busiest air facility in Ontario (after Toronto-Pearson and Ottawa International) serving 770,000 passengers, and growing to handle 2.3million passengers in 2014.

Nearby airports
The Hamilton International Airport is an alternate, relief airport to Pearson.

Travellers from Toronto to the United States alternatively travel from Buffalo Niagara International Airport, located outside of Buffalo, New York, United States. The lower airfares offered for U.S. destinations make travelling from Buffalo a cost-effective alternative, despite the time needed to make the  trip by motor vehicle from Toronto.

There are a number of other general aviation airports in and around the city, including Buttonville Municipal Airport, Markham Airport, Oshawa Airport, Brampton Airport, and Burlington Air Park (also known as Burlington Executive Aerodrome).

Cycling

Cycling in Toronto has improved over the years as the residents and municipal government have become more interested in it as a form of transportation. Toronto has a major program in place to dramatically expand the network through on-road separate bike lanes, with the goal of having any cyclist in the city proper within a five-minute ride of a designated bike route. The network includes a planned 500 km of on-street bike lanes, and another 250 km of off-road paved trails. To date, only a small portion of the network has been built. Gaining approval to put in the on-street bike lanes has proven to be a serious problem, and less than 90 km of the planned 500 km have been set up so far. The small coverage also reduces the overall usefulness of the network, as many of the lanes do not connect with each other (see Metcalfe's Law). In 2011, the Public Bike System Company launched a bicycle sharing system known as BIXI. The system was renamed Bike Share Toronto after it was taken over by the Toronto Parking Authority.

Two major off-road paved trails along the Don and Humber river valleys provide a backbone for transport on the east and west side of the downtown area. However, both trails are non-continuous and quite narrow in areas, making them unsuitable as major transport routes. The two trails are ostensibly connected together via a lakeside route, but due to a massive build-out of this area during the 1990s, the "trail" through much of the downtown area exists in name only.

Nevertheless, Toronto has an extensive bicycle culture. The municipal government encourages bicycle use through its Toronto Bike Plan. An extensive City of Toronto Bicycle Map is available from the City of Toronto free of charge as well as from their website. All TTC buses have bicycle racks attached to their fronts since 2013. Bicycles are allowed on the subway outside of the morning and evening rush hours. Since the late 2000s, the Toronto-Niagara Bike Train Initiative has helped connect Toronto cyclists with Niagara Region bike trails via Via Rail.

Walking
A 2013 study by Walk Score ranked Toronto the 2nd most walkable city in Canada. In addition to surface-level paths and sidewalks, a network of underground pedestrian tunnels are used to connect the various buildings in Downtown Toronto. Known as PATH, it was intended to alleviate pedestrian traffic of downtown's sidewalks. Underground pedestrian tunnels were used in Toronto since 1900, although the construction of the larger PATH network did not commence until the 1960s.

Ferries

The principal ferry service to the Toronto Islands is provided by the city's Parks, Forestry and Recreation division. Ferries run year-round from the Toronto Ferry Docks at the foot of Bay Street to Hanlan's Point, Centre Island, and Ward's Island.

A high-speed passenger/vehicle ferry service across Lake Ontario to Rochester, New York was launched on June 17, 2004, using the vessel Spirit of Ontario I under the marketing term "The Breeze". After experiencing a financing-caused service interruption, it returned to service June 30, 2005, under the ownership of the City of Rochester and operated by Bay Ferries Great Lakes Limited, using the marketing term "The Cat". After an unprofitable summer of operation mostly due to delays, and despite adequate ridership, the newly elected Mayor of Rochester announced on January 10, 2006, that the service would be discontinued and the city would sell the ship, which was purchased by UK-based Euroferries Ltd, for service across the English Channel. It was finally sold in April 2007 to the German company Förde Reederei Seetouristik (FRS) for a ferry service between Spain and Morocco across the Strait of Gibraltar, and the Spirit of Ontario I was renamed HSC Tanger Jet II and later as HSC Dolphin Jet, crossing the Kattegat between Aarhus and Kalundborg in Denmark.

The International Marine Passenger Terminal at 8 Unwin Avenue in the Port Lands, built to accommodate multiple visits per day by The Breeze, is currently only used a couple of times a year to accommodate visiting cruise ships.

The Toronto Ferry Company's private ferry operation was taken over by the Toronto Transit Commission in 1927. The Royal Canadian Yacht Club has operated its two private ferries, the Hiawatha and Kwasind, for over a century.

The city also operates a ferry service to take passengers to and from the Billy Bishop Island Airport with its terminal at the foot of Bathurst Street.

Future prospects and concerns

The regional population of Toronto is expected to reach 7million people within the next 10 years, up from the current 5.5million, making it one of the fastest growing metropolitan areas in North America. Over the last couple of decades, traffic volumes has been increasing steadily in the Greater Toronto Area. However, road and transit investments have not kept pace with the growth in demand. Urban sprawl is a major factor: some commuters travel significant distances within the city and the surrounding GTA for employment. Downtown-to-suburb and suburb-suburb commutes have been increasing as well, which existing public transit services are not organized to efficiently accommodate. This contributes to congestion, adding to travel times and causing smog. Congestion in the GTA is estimated to cost the economy between 6 and 11billion dollars each year. One study found that the average commute time in GTA exceeds that of 19 larger or comparably sized cities. Other studies comparing international cities show that Toronto residents on average spend the most time commuting to work in North America and sixth-most overall in the world.

In March 2004, the Ontario government announced the creation of the "Greater Toronto Transit Authority" (GTTA - not to be confused with GTAA, acronym for the Greater Toronto Airport Authority), renamed Metrolinx in December 2007, with the goal of facilitating improved integration between the city and suburban transport systems. One key element to this integration would be a single fare system, called Presto, to improve the convenience of transfers between different transit agencies. On March 23, 2006, the Government of Ontario announced funding for the extension northward of the TTC's Spadina Subway Line to the York University campus and beyond into the proposed Vaughan Metropolitan Centre in neighbouring Vaughan, York Region. When completed, it will be the first extension of the TTC subway system beyond the current post-1998 municipal border of Toronto. However, Toronto's existing transportation network, particularly public transit, have not kept up with the growth of the city. In the past decade, issues concerning transit funding and expansion have become political football. For example, in 2007, Metrolinx is provided $8.4billion of funding to construct four light rail lines throughout the city, including light rail lines along Eglinton Avenue, Finch Avenue West, and Sheppard Avenue East, as well as a line replacing Line 3 Scarborough, all of which are expected to be completed and in operation by 2020. However, by 2017, political interference from provincial and municipal levels of government, funding cuts and delays meant that no lines will be complete by 2020, with no official opening date set for the initial phase of the Line 5 Eglinton. Funding for the daily operations of the TTC have become chronically low with the removal of provincial funding by the premier Mike Harris in the late 90s, leaving the City of Toronto as the sole source of operational subsidies.

See also

Toronto Transit Commission
GO Transit
Metrolinx

References